William Grant Seaman (November 2, 1866 – April 7, 1942) was a notable Methodist Episcopal minister, academic, and leader in "civic and social causes," including the City Methodist Church in Gary, Indiana.

Early life and education
He was born in Wakarusa, Indiana to Joseph Washington Seaman and Sarah Margaret Uline. 
He studied at Fort Wayne Methodist Academy and graduated from Depauw University in 1891, and was a member of Beta Theta Pi and Phi Beta Kappa. 
He earned a PhD from Boston University in 1897. He was given a D.D. degree from Depauw in 1918.

Career
He sang in the Depauw Male Quartet before being ordained as a Methodist minister in Anderson, Indiana. He was minister in Sudbury, Massachusetts from 1893-1898, State Street M.E. Church in Springfield, Massachusetts from 1898-1900, and Wesley Church in Salem, Massachusetts from 1900-1904. 
He was a chair of Philosophy at Depauw University from 1904-1912 before becoming president of Dakota Wesleyan University in the latter year.

Beginning in 1916, he was the minister of the City Methodist Church in Gary, Indiana. He led an effort to build a large new church, the largest Methodist church in the midwest, largely through donations from U.S. Steel. He was transferred to Ohio, and died in a car accident in 1944. His ashes were eventually interned in the City Methodist Church.

Family life
He married Laura Owen Rice in Newton, Massachusetts on June 28, 1907. She was the daughter of The Rev. Dr. Charles Francis Rice and Miriam Owen Rice. She was born in Springfield, Massachusetts in 1876, attended Cambridge Rindge and Latin School and Vassar College, where she elected to Phi Beta Kappa. She was director of the Springfield YMCA from 1900-1904. 
She was a member of the Associated Alumnae of Vassar College, National Child Labor Committee, the Edmund Rice (1638) Association, the Greencastle Women's Club, the Greencastle Art Club, the Springfield, MA College Club.

Their children were Miriam Seaman (b. 1908), William Rice Seaman (b. 1909), and Charles Francis Seaman (b. 1912).

References

1866 births
1944 deaths
Activists from Indiana
People from Indiana